is a freelance Japanese voice actress from Kurashiki, Okayama. She is best known for voicing Kirby in the eponymous game series and for voicing Ness from the EarthBound series in Super Smash Bros..

Personal life
On March 15, 2020, she had her appendix removed.

Filmography

Anime
Angel Heart (Joy Rō)
Armitage III (OAV)
Atashin'chi (Rio)
Bakumatsu Kikansetsu Irohanihoheto
Bakusou Kyoudai Let's & Go!! MAX (Nero Stella Boruzoi)
Battle B-Daman: Fire Spirits (Gunnos) 2005
Battle B-Daman (Mirumasu)
Battle Spirits: Shōnen Toppa Bashin (Baito-san)
Black Jack (Mika)
Bobobo-bo Bo-bobo (LOVE)
Captain Tsubasa: Road to 2002 (Yoshiko Fujisawa)
Cheeky Angel (Miki Hanakain) 2002
Super Yo-Yo (Mai Kirisaki)
Code Geass: Lelouch of the Rebellion (SP (ep 21)) 2006
Corrector Yui (Yui Kasuga) 1999
Crayon Shin-chan (Micchi Hatogoya (2nd Voice); Yuu Yakutsukuri)
Crush Gear Turbo (Kishin Ōkawa)
Cutie Honey Flash (Aki Natsuko)
Cyborg Kuro-chan (Devil Matatabi; Matatabi)
Danganronpa: The Animation (Sayaka Maizono) 2013
Danganronpa 3: The End of Hope's Peak High School (Sayaka Maizono)
Demashita! Powerpuff Girls Z (Ken Kitazawa)
Detective Conan: Jolly Roger in the Deep Azure (movie 11) as Chinatsu Mabuchi 2007
Detective Conan: The Lost Ship in the Sky (movie 14) as Female Announcer
Digimon Frontier as ToyAgumon
Doraemon: Obāchan no Omoide (Young Nobita)
Elmer no Bouken: My Father's Dragon (Lucy)
Gegege no Kitarō (Yobuko (ep 92); Kenta (ep 61); Kouhei (ep 65); Rina (ep 37); Satoshi (ep 16); Yusuke (ep 48))
Gokudo (Ikkyū)
Gun Sword (Carossa)
Hakugei: Legend of the Moby Dick (Atre)
Hunter × Hunter (2011) (Ortho Sibling)
Interlude (OAV) (Aya's Mother (ep 2))
Inuyasha: The Final Act (Bone Demon)
Jigoku Sensei Nūbē (Yoshie Satou) 1996
KenIchi the Mightiest Disciple Izumi Yuka
Kikou Sennyo Rouran (Mahoro Mikogami)
Kirby: Right Back at Ya! (Kirby, Rick, Hohhe)
Kiteretsu Daihyakka (Woman)
Kochira Katsushika-ku Kameari Kōen-mae Hashutsujo
Lost Universe (Rob)
Mermaid's Forest TV (Masato)
Midori Days (Makie)
Nightwalker (Mikako)
One Piece (Makino, Tamanegi, Miss Monday)
Onmyou Taisenki (Utsuho, Shōsetsu no Tankamui)
Project ARMS (Jeff Bowen)
Puni Puni Poemi (Mitsuki Aasu)
s-CRY-ed (Shoka, Fani Terakado) 2001
Sailor Moon S (Child (ep 116); Daimon 1 (ep 124); Girl (ep 115))
Sailor Moon Sailor Stars (Airport Announcer (ep 188); Host (ep 178); Lily (ep 171); Manager (ep 174))
Sailor Moon SuperS (Ame-tama (ep 158))
Shijou Saikyou no Deshi Kenichi (Ureka)
Shin Chan (Micchi) & (Yuu)
Spectral Force (OAV) (Little Snow)
Street Fighter II: The Movie (Voice on Phone)
Tenshi na Konamaiki (Miki Hanakain)
The Wallflower (Ikeda)
Voltage Fighter Gowcaizer (OAV) (Kubira)
Yomigaeru Sora – Rescue Wings (Student volunteer (ep 4); Yumi)
You're Under Arrest (Kazuyo Kawada (ep 18))
Zoids: Chaotic Century (Fīne Eleceene Lyney)

Video games
Airforce Delta Strike – Ruth Valentine
Danganronpa: Trigger Happy Havoc – Sayaka Maizono
Everybody's Golf 4 – Aimi, Kazuma
Fire Emblem Heroes – Nephenee, Lyn
Fire Emblem Warriors – Lyn
Fire Emblem Engage - Lyn
Kid Icarus: Uprising – Viridi
Kirby – Kirby, Queen Sectonia, Susie
Mobile Suit Gundam SEED: Owaranai Asu e – Shiho Hahnenfuss
Purikura Daisakusen – Grey O'Brien
Samurai Warriors – Inahime (starting from Xtreme Legends), as well in Warriors Orochi
Shining Force 3 – Grace
Super Smash Bros. – Kirby, Ness, Lyn, Viridi
Tales of Vesperia – Witchell
WarTech: Senko no Ronde – Sakurako Sanjo

Dubbing roles
2 Days in the Valley (Susan Parish (Glenne Headly))

References

Notes

External links
  
 Makiko Ohmoto at GamePlaza-Haruka Voice Acting Database 
 Makiko Ohmoto at Hitoshi Doi's Seiyuu Database 
 

1973 births
Living people
Aoni Production voice actors
Voice actresses from Okayama Prefecture
Japanese video game actresses
Japanese voice actresses
Kirby (series)
Mother (video game series)
People from Kurashiki